Matane is a city in Quebec, Canada.

Matane may also refer to:

Matane (electoral district), Quebec, a federal district
Matane (provincial electoral district), Quebec
Matane was the former name of La Matanie Regional County Municipality, Quebec
Matane River, Quebec
Paulias Matane (1931–2021), Governor-General of Papua New Guinea
"Mata ne", a 2008 song by Dreams Come True